First Financial Bancorp is a regional bank headquartered in Cincinnati, Ohio, with its operations centers in the northern Cincinnati suburb of Springdale, and Greensburg, Indiana. Founded in 1863, First Financial has the sixth oldest national bank charter and has 110 locations in Ohio, Kentucky, and throughout Indiana.
First Financial acquired Irwin Financial Corp and its subsidiaries through a government assisted transaction on September 18, 2009.

The company's subsidiary, First Financial Bank, N.A., founded in 1863, provides banking and financial services products through its three lines of business: commercial, consumer and wealth management. The commercial and consumer units provide traditional banking services to business and consumer clients. First Financial Wealth Management provides wealth planning, portfolio management, trust and estate, brokerage and retirement plan services and had approximately $15.9 billion in assets as of September 30, 2020.

History
First Financial Bank, N.A., was founded in 1863 as the First National Bank of Hamilton and was granted charter number 56 on August 10, 1863, under the National Bank Act. The bank opened its first branch in Hamilton, Ohio and started business on August 15, 1863. In 1923, the bank's name was changed to First National Bank and Trust Company of Hamilton when the trust division was created.

In 1980, the First National Bank of Hamilton consolidated operations with the First National Bank of Middletown to form the First National Bank of Southwestern Ohio. The acquisition of smaller institutions allowed it to expand outside Butler County. First Financial Bancorp, a holding company, was formed in 1983.

In 2008, First Financial Bancorp relocated its headquarters to Norwood while the headquarters for the bank remained in Hamilton. The following year, the holding company moved their headquarters to the Atrium One building in Downtown Cincinnati before finally settling into the Chemed Center building, renamed First Financial Center, in 2011.

In July 2017, First Financial agreed to purchase Greensburg, Indiana based MainSource Bank for $1 billion, making First Financial the fourth-largest bank in Cincinnati, and the second-largest local bank. The combined organization will continue to be called First Financial Bancorp. The acquisition was finalized on April 2, 2018. All MainSource computer systems and deposits were transitioned to First Financial on May 29, 2018.

References

External links
 

Banks based in Ohio
American companies established in 1863
Banks established in 1863
Companies listed on the Nasdaq
Companies based in Cincinnati